Skin is a 48-page graphic novel written by Peter Milligan, created and drawn by Brendan McCarthy and colored by Carol Swain. It tells the story of a young skinhead, Martin Atchitson, who grew up in 1970s London with thalidomide-related birth defects. Milligan has said the story partially addresses "universal themes of major companies shafting people, and corruption in terms of drugs and mass marketing."

Publication history
Skin was planned to be published in the 2000 AD spin-off magazine Crisis in 1989, but the story's controversial subject matter and explicit language made the publisher, Fleetway, uncomfortable. Printers refused to print it, citing similar reasons. The story remained in limbo until it was published as a graphic novel by Kevin Eastman's Tundra Publishing in 1992 with little controversy. Dark Horse Comics reprinted Skin in 2013, as part of the trade-paperback collection The Best of Milligan and McCarthy.

Reception
Tom Palmer, Jr. included Skin in "Palmer's Picks", calling it "a powerful, disturbing book".

Awards
1993: nominated for the  "Best Graphic Album: New" Eisner Award

Influence
Hardcore band Modern Life Is War based their song "Martin Atchet" on the comic.

Notes

References

External links
 Review at Comics Nexus

Comics by Peter Milligan
Tundra Publishing titles
Crisis (Fleetway) comic strips
Skinhead
1992 graphic novels
Diseases and disorders in comics